Stanislav Aleksandrovich Feoktistov (born 14 January 1965) is a former Russian professional footballer.

Club career
He made his professional debut in the Soviet Second League in 1983 for FC Geolog Tyumen.

References

1965 births
Living people
Soviet footballers
Russian footballers
Association football defenders
FC Dynamo Kirov players
FC Tyumen players
FC Lokomotiv Nizhny Novgorod players
Russian Premier League players
Russian football managers
FC Lokomotiv Nizhny Novgorod managers